Odeon 24 was an Italian channel owned by Gold TV, a television network. Originally airing movies, news and weather bulletins, political debates and variety shows, the channel was bought by Primarete and became almost dedicated to infomercials, the non-infomercial programming was removed after Gold TV's buyout of the channel.

Programming
Il Campionato dei Campioni
Playmate
Go Kart
Detto da voi

References

Television channels and stations established in 1987
Free-to-air
Television networks in Italy
Companies based in Milan
Italian-language television networks